An erotic dance is a dance that provides erotic entertainment and whose objective is the stimulation of erotic or sexual thoughts or actions in viewers. Erotic dance is one of several major dance categories based on purpose, such as ceremonial, competitive, performance and social dance.

The erotic dancer's clothing is often minimal, and may be gradually decreased or eliminated altogether. In some areas of the United States where exposure of nipples or genitalia is illegal, a dancer may wear pasties and g-string to stay within the law.

Nudity, however, is not a requirement of erotic dance. The culture and the ability of the human body is a significant aesthetic component in many dance styles.

Erotic dances include the following dance forms or styles:

 Can-can
 Cage dance
 Go-go dance
 Hoochie coochie
 Mujra
 Sexercise
 Striptease (Exotic dancer)
 Pole dance
 Bubble dance
 Fan dance 
 Gown-and-glove striptease
 Lap dance
 Couch dance
 Contact dance
 Limo lap dance
 Dance of the seven veils
 Table dance
Grinding
 Neo-Burlesque
Twerking

Erotic dances are sometimes mistakenly referred to (or euphemised) as exotic dances. While there is overlap, they are not the same. Not all exotic dances are erotic, and vice versa.

See also
 Fetish fashion
 List of dance style categories
 List of dances
 Nudes-A-Poppin'
 Strip club
 Stripper

References and notes 

 McMahon, Tiberius. Uniting Exotic And Erotic Dancers Worldwide, GlobalSecurityReport.com, 2006.

External links